Joliett may refer to:

 Joliet (disambiguation)
 Joliette (disambiguation)

See also
 Juliet (disambiguation)
 Juliette (disambiguation)